Bernina Lagalb railway station is a railway station in the municipality of Pontresina, in the Swiss canton of Graubünden. It is located on the Bernina line of the Rhaetian Railway.

The station has three through tracks, only two of which are served by its two platforms and station building.

The station was opened in 1962, at the same time as the adjacent cable car. The station is situated on the lowest part of a  deviation created in 1934, when the line as far as the Arlas Gallery was moved to the west side of the valley in order to avoid the risk of avalanches. Before that date, the line ran alongside the road and a memorial on the old route honours eight railway workers who lost their lives in an avalanche in 1920.

Services
The following services stop at Bernina Lagalb:

References

External links
 
 

Railway stations in Switzerland opened in 1910
Railway stations in Graubünden
Rhaetian Railway stations